Paul J. Coleman is an American competitive sailor.

Early life
Coleman grew up in Larchmont, New York, close to Horseshoe Harbor and was from a young age interested in sailing.

He and his twin Paul both studied at New York Maritime College. They competed in the 1976 470 Olympic trials, and then, with their brother Gerard, in the Soling.

Sailing career
Coleman has competed in many world class events such as the J/24, Soling and Etchells classes. With his brother Paul he took a gold in the Mallory Cup in the North American Men's Sailing Championship in 1983.

References

External links
 http://articles.baltimoresun.com/1992-02-12/news/9213001403_1_soling-class-miami-olympic-olympic-classes-regatta

American male sailors (sport)
Living people
Soling class sailors
Year of birth missing (living people)